Gerolamo Veneroso (1660 in Genoa – 1739 in Genoa) was the 148th Doge of the Republic of Genoa and king of Corsica.

Biography 
Veneroso was elected doge on January 18, 1726, the one hundred and third in biennial succession and one hundred and forty-eighth in republican history. As doge he was also invested with the related biennial office of king of Corsica. Among the significant events of his mandate, his commitment against the smuggling that raged in western Liguria is attested. The dogato ended on January 18, 1728. Veneroso died in Genoa in 1739.

See also 

 Republic of Genoa
 Doge of Genoa

Sources 

 Buonadonna, Sergio. Rosso doge. I dogi della Repubblica di Genova dal 1339 al 1797.

18th-century Doges of Genoa
1660 births
1739 deaths